Saint-Jean-de-la-Lande was a former parish municipality.  On September 26, 2001, it merged into the city of Saint-Georges, Quebec and became a district of that city.

References

Former municipalities in Quebec
Saint-Georges, Quebec
Populated places disestablished in 2001
2001 disestablishments in Quebec